Khab is a small village in the state of Himachal Pradesh, India. It is located in the Sutlej river valley near the India-Tibet border. National Highway 5 connects Khab with state capital Shimla. Khab sangam is the confluence of Spiti river and Sutlej river. The Spiti river flowing through the spiti valley here meets the Sutlej, which originates from Mansarovar Lake in Tibet. The ancient monastery of Tashigang Gompa is nearby.

Connectivity 
Khab is connected by road with National Highway 5 from state capital Shimla. National Highway 505 starts from Khab and provides connectivity to Spiti valley in Lahaul and Spiti district of Himachal Pradesh.

See also 
 Shipki La

References 

Villages in Kinnaur district